An integral operator is an operator that involves integration. Special instances are:

 The operator of integration itself,  denoted by the integral symbol
 Integral linear operators, which are linear operators induced by bilinear forms involving  integrals
 Integral transforms, which are maps between two function spaces, which involve integrals

Integral calculus